The Waipati River, alternatively known as the Chaslands River is a river in the eastern Catlins, New Zealand. It rises in the Maclennan Range and flows south-eastward into the Waipati Beach north of Chaslands Mistake.

See also
List of rivers of New Zealand

References

 New Zealand 1:50000 Topographic Map Series sheet CG13 – Chaslands

Rivers of Otago
Rivers of New Zealand